Collagasta is a village and municipality within the Fray Mamerto Esquiú Department of Catamarca Province in northwestern Argentina.

References

Populated places in Catamarca Province